The American Billboard magazine, publishes a weekly chart that ranks the highest-selling albums in the country. In 1962, the album chart was known as "Top LP's" and was divided between the mono format, with 150 chart positions and stereo with 50. In 1962, six mono and stereo albums topped the chart.

The first record to top the mono chart was the soundtrack to the 1961 film Blue Hawaii recorded by Elvis Presley. The soundtrack album reached the top in early December 1961 and stayed atop till late April for 20 consecutive weeks. In July 2002, it was certified three times platinum by the Recording Industry Association of America (RIAA). The soundtrack of the American film West Side Story (1961) replaced Blue Hawaii for seven weeks in May and June and for three additional weeks in September and October. Ray Charles' Modern Sounds in Country and Western Music replaced the aforementioned album and topped the chart for 14 consecutive weeks from June till September. The last number on the mono chart in the year was recorded by Vaughn Meader. His comedy album The First Family, which made fun of then-President, John F. Kennedy, topped the chart for the last three weeks in December.

On the stereo chart, Stereo 35/MM by Enoch Light & the Light Brigade could continue its reign which started in mid-November 1961. The album topped the chart in the first week of January, bringing its total to seven weeks atop. Presley's Blue Hawaii was also able to top the chart, but only for four nonconsecutive weeks. Henry Mancini's soundtrack Breakfast at Tiffany's for the film of the same name, spent twelve weeks atop, making it the second longest reigning album atop the stereo chart. West Side Story replaced it in May and topped the chart till May of the following year, for a total of 54 weeks, the longest ever. In August, Ray Charles' Modern Sounds in Country and Western Music, topped it for one week, bringing his total to 15 weeks in both charts.

Over 104 combined chart weeks, West Side Story was the best performing album of the year, spending a combined 53 weeks atop the chart. While, the album spent 53 weeks atop both charts in 1962, Billboard only recognizes the stereo chart as the predecessor of the modern Billboard 200, thus counting only its weeks for the record of most weeks spent on number one. Between May 1962 and May 1963, it spent 54 weeks atop the chart. Furthermore, West Side Story would go on to be the best-selling album on the year, moving some 2,5 million copies. It ultimately became the best-selling album of the 1960s in the US and was certified triple platinum by the RIAA. The album went on to win a Grammy in the category Grammy Award for Best Sound Track Album or Recording of Original Cast From a Motion Picture or Television in 1962.

Chart history

See also
1962 in music
List of number-one albums (United States)

Notes

References

1962
Number-one albums of 1962 (U.S.)